Novokarachevo (Yañı Qaras) is a rural locality (a village) in Mavlyutovsky Selsoviet, Mishkinsky District, Bashkortostan, Russia. The population was 114 as of 2010. There are 3 streets.

Geography 
Novokarachevo is located 17 km north of Mishkino (the district's administrative centre) by road. Mavlyutovo is the nearest rural locality.

References 

Rural localities in Mishkinsky District